Sultan Hassan Secondary School (SMSH) is a government secondary school located in Bangar, the town of Temburong District, Brunei. It is the only secondary school in the district. 

The school provides five years of secondary education, leading up to GCE 'O' Level qualification.

See also 
 List of secondary schools in Brunei

References 

Secondary schools in Brunei
Cambridge schools in Brunei